The 2019 U Sports Women's Ice Hockey Championship was held March 14–17, 2020, in Charlottetown, P.E.I. Guelph defeated McGill by a 1-0 mark in the championship game, as Valerie Lamenta earned the shutout. Guelph captain Kaitlin Lowy scored the game-winning goal, as the Gryphons won their first-ever national championship. Of note, the 2019 event broke attendance records for the history of the U SPORTS women’s hockey championship.

Participating teams

Championship Bracket

Consolation Bracket

Awards and honors
Championship Tournament MVP: Jade Downie-Landry, McGill

Players of the Game

All-Tournament Team

See also 
2019 U Sports University Cup

References 

U Sports women's ice hockey
Ice hockey competitions in Prince Edward Island
2018–19 in Canadian ice hockey
Sports competitions in Charlottetown
Guelph Gryphons